The MTV Video Music Award for Best Concept Video was first given out in 1984, awarding the best videos that involved the conceptual interpretation of a song.  As the years went on, however, the majority of videos aired on MTV became concept videos, and so the need for this category diminished.  Thus, the last of this award was given out in 1988.

Recipients

References 

MTV Video Music Awards
Awards established in 1984
Awards disestablished in 1988